R. Vidyasagar Rao Dindi Lift Irrigation Scheme is a lift irrigation project in Nalgonda, Telangana, India. It serves Nalgonda, Mahbubnagar and Khammam areas. It was named after R. Vidyasagar Rao, a foremost irrigation expert in Telangana.

Dindi reservoir
Dindi Reservoir is a medium water reservoir across Dindi tributary of River Krishna located near Dindi, Mahabubnagar town in Telangana. It is part of Srisailam Left Bank Canal.

This medium reservoir has 59 million cubic meters gross storage capacity. It is close to Nagarjunsagar-Srisailam Tiger Reserve, around 95 kilometers from Hyderabad.

See also
 Srisailam Dam

References

Dams on the Krishna River
Krishna River
Reservoirs in Telangana
Year of establishment missing